Schuyler County Courthouse may refer to:

Schuyler County Courthouse (Illinois)
Schuyler County Courthouse Complex (New York)